3-dehydrosphinganine reductase also known as 3-ketodihydrosphingosine reductase (KDSR) or follicular variant translocation protein 1 (FVT1) is an enzyme that in humans is encoded by the KDSR gene.

Function 

3-dehydrosphinganine reductase catalyzes the chemical reaction:

sphinganine + NADP+  3-dehydrosphinganine + NADPH + H+

Thus, the two substrates of this enzyme are sphinganine and NADP+, whereas its 3 products are 3-dehydrosphinganine, NADPH, and H+.

This enzyme belongs to the family of oxidoreductases, specifically those acting on the CH-OH group of donor with NAD+ or NADP+ as acceptor. This enzyme participates in sphingolipid metabolism.

Tissue distribution 

Follicular lymphoma variant translocation 1 is a secreted protein which is weakly expressed in hematopoietic tissue.

Clinical significance 

FVT1 shows a high rate of transcription in some T cell malignancies and in phytohemagglutinin-stimulated lymphocytes. The proximity of FVT1 to BCL2 suggests that it may participate in the tumoral process.

References

External links

Further reading 

 
 
 
 
 

EC 1.1.1
NADPH-dependent enzymes
Enzymes of unknown structure